Uri Karagula (born December 18, 1978) is an Israeli footballer.

Honours
Liga Alef (South):
Winner (1): 2011-12
Liga Alef (South) - 2007-08 Top Goalscorer (24 goals)
Liga Alef (South) - 2008-09 Top Goalscorer (25 goals)
Liga Alef (South) - 2010-11 Top Goalscorer (22 goals)

References

External links
 
 

1978 births
Living people
Israeli footballers
Footballers from Ramat Gan
Beitar Tel Aviv F.C. players
Beitar Tel Aviv Bat Yam F.C. players
Maccabi Ahi Nazareth F.C. players
Hapoel Tayibe F.C. players
Hapoel Tel Aviv F.C. players
Hapoel Nir Ramat HaSharon F.C. players
Maccabi Ironi Bat Yam F.C. players
Maccabi Yavne F.C. players
Maccabi Ironi Amishav Petah Tikva F.C. players
Hapoel Azor F.C. players
Maccabi Jaffa F.C. players
Hapoel Kfar Shalem F.C. players
Maccabi Sha'arayim F.C. players
Israeli Premier League players
Liga Leumit players
Israeli people of Iraqi-Jewish descent
Israeli football managers
Maccabi Jaffa F.C. managers
Maccabi Yavne F.C. managers
Hapoel Marmorek F.C. managers
Maccabi Ironi Ashdod F.C. managers
Association football forwards